Hubert Eustace "Hughie" Webb (30 May 1927 – 8 November 2010) was a pioneering professor of neurovirology at St Thomas's Hospital in London who was an outstanding sportsman in his student days.

Sporting career
Webb was born in India, the son of Indian Army Political Service official Wilfred Webb and Kathleen du Boulay. He was sent to school at Winchester College where he was an outstanding sports player: his Royal College of Physicians biography states that Field-Marshal Sir Bernard Montgomery was so impressed by Webb's captaincy in the Winchester–Eton match of 1945 that he took him with a friend to Germany for two weeks. Webb went to New College, Oxford on a scholarship and then trained in medicine at St Thomas's Hospital in London.

At Oxford University, Webb won Blues in four sports: golf, cricket, squash and rackets. As a cricketer, he was a right-handed batsman who bowled occasional leg breaks.

Webb made his first-class debut for Oxford University against Lancashire in the 1946 season, but had little success that season and was dropped after three games; he did not play any first-class cricket in 1947. He returned to the Oxford team in 1948 making 36 and 59 in his first match and scoring usefully if unspectacularly in county matches, with a batting average of just 18 before the University Match. In the University Match against Cambridge University, however, Webb's batting was sensational: he made an unbeaten 145 in 170 minutes, including an eighth wicket partnership of 112 in 50 minutes in which, Wisden Cricketers' Almanack wrote, "Webb was supreme". Oxford, having been beaten by an innings by Cambridge in each of the previous two seasons, won the match themselves by an innings, their first innings victory in the series since 1923.

With medical studies then taking up his life, that innings was almost the end of Webb in first-class cricket: he reappeared in non-first-class matches for The Army in 1954 and also played one further first-class match that year, representing Hampshire against Oxford University.

Medical career
Webb qualified as a physician at St Thomas's Hospital in 1951 and was appointed as a house surgeon. He took a short-service commission in the British Army as his National Service and was posted to Singapore where he worked in the British Military Hospital. After his discharge from the army, he stayed in Malaya and then moved to work at Poona in India where he made a study of the Kyasanur Forest disease which affected both monkeys and humans; this led to the first in a long series of learned papers in medical journals and a lifelong career in neurovirology. In 1964 he was appointed as a neurology consultant at St Thomas's Hospital, and he was later promoted to professor of neurovirology, remaining there for the rest of his career. He died on 8 November 2010.

Family
Webb married Monica Macpherson in 1950; they had a son and a daughter. His nephew Moray Macpherson and his uncle, Arthur du Boulay both played first-class cricket.

References

External links
Hubert Webb at Cricinfo
Hubert Webb at CricketArchive
Matches and detailed statistics for Hubert Webb

1927 births
2010 deaths
Cricketers from Rajasthan
Alumni of New College, Oxford
English cricketers
Oxford University cricketers
Hampshire cricketers